Kihlepa is a village in Audru Parish, Pärnu County, in southwestern Estonia. It has a population of 159 (as of 1 January 2011).

Kihlepa is the location of a pig farm that accommodates 2,800 pigs. It is owned by OÜ Lõpe Agro and produces pigs for Rakvere Lihakombinaat.

Gallery

References

Villages in Pärnu County
Kreis Pernau